The Order of Makarios III is the senior order of knighthood awarded by Cyprus. Established in 1991, the order is named after the first President of Cyprus, Archbishop Makarios III.

Grades
The Order of Makarios III is awarded in the following six grades:
Grand Collar of the Order of Makarios III
Grand Cross of the Order of Makarios III
Grand Commander of the Order of Makarios III
Commander of the Order of Makarios III
Officer of the Order of Makarios III
Knight of the Order of Makarios III.

Notable recipients
King Abdullah II of Jordan (Grand Collar)
King Birendra of Nepal (Grand Collar)
Isaac Herzog, President of Israel (Grand Collar)
Marcelo Rebelo de Sousa, President of Portugal (Grand Collar)
Katerina Sakellaropoulou, President of Greece (Grand Collar)
Nassir Abdulaziz Al-Nasser (Grand Commander)
Dimitris Avramopoulos (Knight)
John Brademas (Grand Cross)
Witold Dzielski (Commander)
Sergey Lavrov (Grand Cross)
Vyron Polydoras (Officer)
Paul Sarbanes<ref name=record/ (Grand Cross)

See also
 Archbishop Makarios III
 President of Cyprus

References

Orders, decorations, and medals of Cyprus
Awards established in 1991
1991 establishments in Cyprus